Proischnura is a genus of damselfly in the family Coenagrionidae. It contains the following species:
 Proischnura polychromatica
 Proischnura rotundipennis
 Proischnura subfurcata

References 

Coenagrionidae
Zygoptera genera
Taxonomy articles created by Polbot